Gulf is an unincorporated community and census-designated place (CDP) in southwestern Chatham County, North Carolina, United States, southeast of the town of Goldston. As of the 2010 census, the Gulf CDP had a population of 144. The community is home to a general store and several historic homes. It received its name from its location at a wide bend in the Deep River.

Gulf is an interconnection point between the Norfolk Southern Railway and the Aberdeen, Carolina and Western Railway.

Historic sites
The Haughton-McIver House and Marion Jasper Jordan Farm are listed on the National Register of Historic Places.

Geography
Gulf is located on the southern border of Chatham County, on the north side of Deep River. The Cape Fear River forms at the confluence of the Deep and Haw rivers, approximately 20 miles downstream of Gulf.

Gulf is at the geographical center of North Carolina.

Demographics

References

External links
 Atlantic & Yadkin Railway

Census-designated places in Chatham County, North Carolina
Census-designated places in North Carolina